Graphisurus fasciatus is a species of longhorn beetles of the subfamily Lamiinae. It was described by Degeer in 1775, and is known from eastern North America.

References

Beetles described in 1775
Acanthocinini
Taxa named by Charles De Geer